Nadine Fest (born 28 June 1998) is an Austrian alpine skier.

Career
She at young level won the gold medal in super-G at the 2016 Winter Youth Olympic Games and two gold medals in super-G and combined at the World Junior Alpine Skiing Championships 2017.

At open level she won a FIS Alpine Ski Europa Cup in 2020.

World Cup results
Top 10

Europa Cup results
Fest has won an overall Europa Cup and 5 specialty standings.

FIS Alpine Ski Europa Cup
Overall: 2020
Downhill: 2020
Super-G: 2017, 2020
Combined: 2017, 2020

References

External links
 
 

1998 births
Living people
Austrian female alpine skiers
Alpine skiers at the 2016 Winter Youth Olympics
Youth Olympic gold medalists for Austria